Cogniaux is a surname. Notable people with the surname include:

 Alfred Cogniaux (1841–1916), Belgian botanist
 Robert Cogniaux (born 1934), Belgian Olympic archer